Ralph Victor Gilles (born 14 January 1970) is a Canadian-American automobile designer and executive. In 1992, he joined Chrysler. Gilles styled the North American Car of the Year-winning 2005 Chrysler 300.  Gilles also led the design team that created the 2014 SRT Dodge Viper. Gilles was the President and CEO of Chrysler's SRT brand and Senior Vice President of Design at Chrysler before being promoted to Head of Design for Fiat Chrysler Automobiles in April 2015. Following FCA's merger into the Stellantis group in 2021, he became chief design officer of the newly merged company.

Background
Born in New York City to Haitian immigrants, Gilles was raised in Montreal, Quebec. Gilles was drawing concept vehicles at the age of eight. When he was fourteen years old, his aunt Gisele Mouscardy sent one of his sketches to then Chrysler chairman Lee Iacocca. A reply came from K. Neil Walling, Chrysler's design chief at the time, suggesting he attend one of three design schools.

He lives in Oxford, Michigan.

Education
He studied at Vanier College in Montreal, before moving back to the United States for university studies. Gilles attended the College for Creative Studies in Detroit, Michigan, and in 2002 received an Executive MBA from Michigan State University.

Career
In 1992, he joined Chrysler. In August of 2008, Gilles replaced the retiring Trevor Creed as Senior Vice President of Design. In October 2009, Gilles was promoted to president and CEO of the Dodge car brand. He was replaced as Dodge's CEO in June 2011, remaining Senior Vice President of Design and becoming CEO of Chrysler's Street and Racing Technology division.

Gilles was profiled in the first season of the Netflix docu-series Abstract: The Art of Design.

References

1970 births
American people of Haitian descent
Living people
College for Creative Studies alumni
Michigan State University alumni
Canadian engineers
Chrysler designers
American emigrants to Canada
Businesspeople from Montreal
Haitian Quebecers
Chrysler executives
American automobile designers
People from Oxford, Michigan